Jesús Montoya Alarcon (born 4 December 1963) is a Spanish former road bicycle racer.

Major results

1986
 1st  Overall Circuito Montañés
1987
 6th Overall Vuelta a Murcia
1990
 1st  Overall Vuelta a los Valles Mineros
 1st Stage 4 Volta a Catalunya
 5th Overall Euskal Bizikleta
1991
 1st Klasika Primavera
 1st Stage 19 Vuelta a España
 3rd Subida a Urkiola
 6th Overall Vuelta a Murcia
1992
 2nd Overall Vuelta a España
 2nd Overall Vuelta a Andalucía
1st Stage 4
 3rd Overall Vuelta a Asturias
 4th Overall Paris–Nice
1993
 1st Subida al Naranco
 5th Overall Vuelta a España
1st Stage 15
 8th Overall Volta a Catalunya
1994
 1st Stage 6 Setmana Catalana de Ciclisme
 2nd Overall Paris–Nice
 2nd Klasika Primavera
1995
 1st  Road race, National Road Championships
 3rd Overall Volta a Catalunya
 10th Overall Tour de Romandie
1996
 6th Overall Tour of the Basque Country

External links
Palmarès by cyclingbase.com 

1963 births
Spanish male cyclists
Living people
People from Huerta de Murcia
Cyclists from the Region of Murcia
Spanish Vuelta a España stage winners